The Rebel You Love to Hate is the sixth full-length studio album from American crossover thrash band, M.O.D. It was released in 2003 on Nuclear Blast Records and follows 1996's Dictated Aggression. It was followed in 2007 by Red, White & Screwed
The album saw longer songs and a harder sound and in the intervening years since their last album, a new guitarist and drummer, as Milano once again shuffled the personnel around him. The cover is a reference to the logo of The Michael Schenker Group.

Track listing
All songs written by Billy Milano

Credits
 Billy Milano – vocals, bass
 Joe Affe – guitar
 Danny Burkhardt – drums
 Recorded at Big Blue Meenie, Jersey City, New Jersey, USA
 Produced by Paul Crook and Billy Milano
 Additional production by Scott Metaxes
 Engineered by Erin Farley
 Additionally engineered by Tim Gilles
 Mixed at Watermusic Studio, Hoboken, New Jersey by Billy Milano and Dan Korneff

References

External links
Nuclear Blast album page
MOD and SOD official fansite
BNR Metal discography page

2003 albums
M.O.D. albums
Nuclear Blast albums